The Moyer Lectures were an annual series of theological lectures delivered in London from 1719 to 1774, designed to support the orthodox interpretation of the Christian Trinity.

The initial lecturer was Daniel Waterland, who had much to do with the selection of lecturers in the early years. The series was endowed by the 1723 will of Rebecca Moyer, widow of the merchant Sir Samuel Moyer.

The final lecture series was given by Thomas Morell. At this point Lady Moyer's heirs exercised their option to discontinue the series.

Lecturers

1719 Daniel Waterland
1720 James Knight
1721 William Lupton
1722 Edmund Chishull
1723 William Berriman
1724 Thomas Bishop
1725 Andrew Trebeck
1726 Alexander Innis
1727 Philip Gretton
1728 Henry Felton
1729 Joseph Trapp
1730 John Brown
1731 John Hay
1732 Jeremiah Seed
1733 Charles Wheatly
1734 Theodore Waterland
1735 Edward Underhill
1736 Valentine Haywood
1737 John Berriman
1738 Leonard Twells
1739 Arthur Bedford
1740 Gloster Ridley
1754 William Dodd
1757 William Clements
1764 Benjamin Dawson
Peter Newcome, at the end of the series.
1773 Thomas Morell

References

Notes

Christian theological lectures
History of the Church of England
Annual events in London
Recurring events established in 1719
Recurring events disestablished in 1774
1719 establishments in England
1774 disestablishments in England